Pfadi Winterthur  is a team handball club from Switzerland. Currently, Pfadi Winterthur competes in the Swiss First League of Handball.

The club developed out of an informal handball team which won the competitions during the national jamboree of the Schweizer Pfadfinderbund in 1938. The prefix Pfadi (Scout) commemorates the club's roots in the Scout Movement.

Honours
Swiss champion: 1992, 1994, 1995, 1996, 1997, 1998, 2002, 2003, 2004, 2021.
Swiss-Cup (SHV-Cup) winner: 1998, 2003, 2010, 2015, 2018.
Swiss SuperCup winner: 2004, 2018, 2021.
Swiss field handball-Cup winner: 1958, 1998, 2001.
EHF Challenge Cup finalist: 2001.
EHF Cup semifinalist: 1982.
Euro City Cup semifinalist: 2000 (successor after 2000: EHF Challenge Cup)
EHF Champions League quarterfinalist: 1997, 1998, 2003.

Sports Hall information

Arena: – Winterthur Central Sports Hall 
City: – Winterthur 
Capacity: – 2000
Address: – Grüzefeldstrasse 32, 8400 Winterthur

European record

EHF European League

Current squad
Squad for the 2021–22 season

Goalkeepers
1  Yahav Shamir
 16  Dennis Wipf
Left wingers
8  Fabrizio Pecoraro
 21  Joël Bräm
 35  Noam Leopold
Right wingers
4  Lukas Osterwalder
6  Cédrie Tynowski
 11  Benedikt Dechow
Line players
2  Remi Leventoux
 15  Yannick Shtörchli
 26  Otto Lagerquist

Left backs
5  Henrik Schönfeldt
 11  Roman Sidorowicz
Central backs
3  Yannick Ott
 20  Kevin Jud 
 33  Moustafa Sadok
Right backs
 22  Stefan Freivogel
 23  Giorgi Tskhovrebadze

Transfers
Transfers for the 2022-23 season

Joining
  Admir Ahmetašević (GK) (from  Wisła Płock)
  Viran Morros (LB) (from  Füchse Berlin)

Leaving
  Yahav Shamir (GK) (to ?)
  Roman Sidorowicz (LB) (retires)

Notable former players

 Paek Won-chul
 Cho Chi-hyo
 Kang Jae-won
 Erik Veje Rasmussen
 Marc Baumgartner
 Matías Schulz
 Morten Schønfeldt
 Markus Baur
 Goran Cvetković

External links
  
 

Swiss handball clubs
Winterthur
Scouting-related associations
Scouting and Guiding in Switzerland
Handball clubs established in 1938
1938 establishments in Switzerland